Oranga is a small residential suburb in Auckland, New Zealand. It is located nine kilometres to the southeast of the city centre, between the commercial suburbs of Te Papapa and Penrose to the south and east, and the residential suburbs of One Tree Hill and Onehunga to the north and south. 

It used to be a state housing neighbourhood for low-income families, but it is rapidly gentrifying. Private investors have bought many of the state houses for renovation, and to subdivide their generous sections. Real estate agents increasingly advertise these houses as belonging to the wealthier suburb of One Tree Hill.

Local facilities include Oranga Kindergarten (neighbouring Fergusson Domain), and Oranga School. The local secondary schools are One Tree Hill College, Marcellin College and Onehunga High School.

Demographics

 
Oranga had a population of 3,198 at the 2018 New Zealand census, an increase of 246 people (8.3%) since the 2013 census, and an increase of 393 people (14.0%) since the 2006 census. There were 879 households, comprising 1,578 males and 1,620 females, giving a sex ratio of 0.97 males per female. The median age was 29.6 years (compared with 37.4 years nationally), with 792 people (24.8%) aged under 15 years, 825 (25.8%) aged 15 to 29, 1,287 (40.2%) aged 30 to 64, and 297 (9.3%) aged 65 or older.

Ethnicities were 32.6% European/Pākehā, 17.2% Māori, 50.0% Pacific peoples, 15.2% Asian, and 3.1% other ethnicities. People may identify with more than one ethnicity.

The percentage of people born overseas was 34.3, compared with 27.1% nationally.

Although some people chose not to answer the census's question about religious affiliation, 29.0% had no religion, 55.6% were Christian, 1.8% had Māori religious beliefs, 3.2% were Hindu, 2.0% were Muslim, 1.8% were Buddhist and 1.4% had other religions.

Of those at least 15 years old, 510 (21.2%) people had a bachelor's or higher degree, and 543 (22.6%) people had no formal qualifications. The median income was $23,100, compared with $31,800 nationally. 288 people (12.0%) earned over $70,000 compared to 17.2% nationally. The employment status of those at least 15 was that 1,167 (48.5%) people were employed full-time, 231 (9.6%) were part-time, and 150 (6.2%) were unemployed.

Oranga Round Concrete Sheds

The side photograph includes the two hundred or so unique concrete sheds built around 1947 in the vicinity of Oranga, Onehunga, Auckland. While their blueprints are possibly lost to time we know they were constructed of a base, cylinder, and roof using wood forms that will have been reused to begin the build process anew after each pouring, also their parts may have been built off-site and then assembled on location. The ceiling view had the appearance of the form being constructed like a cheese segment style rotation that was then poured and mounted atop with a slight overhang or eave around the outside. A single circular indent system was used to hold the roof in place atop the cylinder. These handy out-buildings featured a door and window opposite (upper four louvre with lower pane), with a small drainage hole at the floor wall corner below, while above outside the roof had a designed-in circular shallow v-gutter around the outer edge making for simple rain channeling with a drainage dip off to one side for water run-off. The roof could not be walked upon as the studfinder shows little or no reinforcing. The interior walls had around six vertical equally spaced planks attached for holding tools. The walls were around two and a half inches thick for the cylinder, and three inches for the roof section, and three for the base which sat in-line with the cylinder, Their large internal space measuring eight feet across the floor and seven feet to the apex above meant they could be used as a place for storage and or dispatching fowl back in the day. Slight banding and nail head indents can be seen around the exterior and interior walls where the wood forms had been erected for pouring day. The exterior was given a simple white coating.

References 

Suburbs of Auckland